George Castle (born October 8, 1984) from Glenside, Pennsylvania, is an American lacrosse player previously with the Philadelphia Wings of National Lacrosse League. He is a defensive midfielder.  A William Penn Charter School graduate, Castle played collegiate lacrosse with the Johns Hopkins Blue Jays where he helped his team win two national championships.

In December 2008, he joined the Philadelphia Wings as a free agent for the 2009 season, primarily as a defensive player. Castle's father, J.R. Castle, played on the Wings' inaugural team during its 1987 season.

In 2012, Castle was selected in the 4th round of the 2012 North American Lacrosse League draft (23rd overall) and played for the Stickhorses in their 2013 NALL campaign.

The Radotin Custodes (Czech Republic) also selected Castle 17th overall in the European Lacrosse League draft  where he also competed in the 2013 ELL season.

See also
List of family relations in the National Lacrosse League
Lacrosse in Pennsylvania

References

1984 births
Living people
American lacrosse players
Johns Hopkins Blue Jays men's lacrosse players
Philadelphia Wings players
People from Cheltenham, Pennsylvania
Sportspeople from Montgomery County, Pennsylvania